Shakuntala is character from Hindu epic Mahabharata.

Shakuntala, or variant spellings such as Sacontala or Sakuntala, may refer to:

 Shakuntala (play), by Kalidasa (Sanskrit, 5th century CE or earlier)
 Shakuntala (epic), a poem by Laxmi Prasad Devkota (Nepali, 20th century CE) based on the eponymous play by Kalidasa
 Sakuntala (opera), composed in 1820 by Franz Schubert
 Shakuntala (Raja Ravi Varma), an 1870 epic painting by Raja Ravi Varma
 [La leggenda di] Sakùntala, opera in two versions (1921, 1952) by Franco Alfano
 Sakuntalai, 1940 Tamil film
 Shakuntala (1943 film), a 1943 costume drama film
 Shakuntala (1965 film), a 1965 Malayalam film
 Shakuntala (1920 film), a 1920 film directed by Suchet Singh
 Sakunthala (1966 film), a 1966 Telugu mythological film
 Shakuntala (TV series), an Indian television series
 Sakuntala (Claudel), a sculpture by Camille Claudel
 Sakuntalam, 2021 Sanskrit language Indian film

People
 Shakuntala Bhagat (1933–2012), civil engineer
 Shakuntala Barua (born 1947), actress
 Shakuntala Devi (1929–2013), writer
 Shakuntala Paranjpye (1906–2000), writer
 Sakuntla Devi (born 1972), politician
 Sakuntala Laguri, politician
 Telangana Shakuntala (1951–2014), actress

Other
 Shakuntala Park, in Kolkata
 Shakuntala Railway, in central India

Feminine given names